Boca or BOCA may refer to:

Entertainment
Boca, a 1994 film starring Rae Dawn Chong
Boca (2010 film), a 2010 Brazilian film
"Boca" (The Sopranos episode), a 1999 episode of the American television series The Sopranos
"Boca", a song by Dreamcatcher from Dystopia Lose Myself (2020)

Locations
La Boca, a neighbourhood of Buenos Aires, Argentina
La Boca Formation, a geological formation in Mexico
Boca, California, a former settlement
Boca, a village in Samarinești Commune, Gorj County, Romania
Boca Chica, a municipality of the Santo Domingo province in the Dominican Republic
Boca Chica Key, an island in the lower Florida Keys
Boca Chica (disambiguation), several places
Boca, Novara, a municipality in the Province of Novara, Italy
Boca Del Mar, Florida, a census-designated place in Palm Beach County, Florida
Boca del Río, Veracruz, a city in the Mexican state of Veracruz
Boca Grande, Florida, a town on Gasparilla Island, Florida
Boca grande (disambiguation), several places
Boca Pointe, Florida, a census-designated place in Palm Beach County, Florida
Boca Raton, Florida, a city in Palm Beach County, Florida
Boca Raton (disambiguation), several places
Several straits separating Trinidad and Tobago from the South American mainland:
The Bocas del Dragón (consisting of the Boca Grande, Boca de Navios, Boca de Huevos, and Boca de Monos)
The Boca del Serpiente or Columbus Channel
The Bocas Islands, which lie in the Bocas del Dragón
Boca (river), a tributary of the Siret in eastern Romania
La Boca, New Mexico, a census-designated place

People
Andrea Del Boca, an Argentine television actress
Carlos Bocanegra, nicknamed 'Boca', an American soccer player

Sports
Boca Juniors, a sports club based in La Boca neighborhood of Buenos Aires, Argentina
Boca Unidos, a sports club based in Corrientes, Argentina
Boca F.C., a defunct football team from Belize
A.S.D. Boca Pietri, a football team from Bologna, Italy
Boca Ascesa Val Liona, a football team from Grancona, Italy
Sociedade Boca Júnior Futebol Clube, a football club based in Cristinápolis, Sergipe, Brazil

Other uses
Bird Observation & Conservation Australia, the former Bird Observers Club of Australia
Bloque Obrero Comunista de Andalucía, an Andalusian Communist group
Boca Burger, an American brand of vegetarian hamburger
Bureau of Consular Affairs (Republic of China), a government agency in Taiwan
BOCA National Property Maintenance Code, a publication created by the Building Officials Code Administrators International (BOCA). See International Building Code
Boca Research Inc., was a modem manufacturer, acquired at 2000 by Zoom Telephonics
 Boulevard Oaks Civic Association, for the neighborhood of Boulevard Oaks, Houston, Texas

See also

 
 Boca Chica (disambiguation) (Small Boca)
 Boca grande (disambiguation) (Large Boca)